The Satyanarayanã Puja is a religious ritual worship of the Hindu god Vishnu.

The puja is described in the Skanda Purana, a medieval era Sanskrit text. According to Madhuri Yadlapati, the Satyanarayana Puja is an archetypal example of how "the Hindu puja facilitates the intimacy of devotional worship while enabling a humble sense of participating gratefully in a larger sacred world".

The Puja 
The puja narrates the Satyanarayana Katha (story), which dictates the various worldly and spiritual benefits the puja brings to performers. The Katha states how the deity Narayana vows to aid his devotees during Kali Yuga, the last of the four ages in Hindu cosmology, in particular the performers and attendees of the Satyanarayana Puja. The Katha narrates that the performance of the puja is in itself a promise to God, and recounts the plights of characters who either fail to complete the puja or forget their promises.

Items needed for puja
The following is a list of items needed for the puja.

 Haldi (turmeric powder)
 Kumkum (red, vermillion or sindoor)
 Navadhanya (nine types of grains each representing one of the navagraha, nine planets)
Naivedhya (food which we offer to God)
 Incense sticks (agarbattis)
 Camphor
 Sandalwood paste
 A picture of Lord Satyanarayana
 A small idol (or coin) of Lord Satyanarayana (optional)
 Wheat or Jawar (not rice)
 Durva Or Dhoop grass (sacred grass according to Sanatana Dharma) 
 Betelnut leaves (100)
 Betel nuts (50)
 Coins (40)
 Dry Dates/Almonds (50)
 Coconut (8)
 Flowers, Tulasi leaves 
 Garland and floral garlands
 Two jars (Silver, Copper, Brass, or even earthen) – one for Kalash and another for the ritual
 Two flat plates 
 A bell
 Low Altar table (for use as Altar) 
 A large yellow cloth (to cover the Altar), yellow is the favorite color of Satnarayan.
 A piece of yellow or red cloth (for the Kalash)
 A ghee lamp (with at least three wicks)
 An oil lamp
 Cotton wicks
 Panchamrita (uncooked mixture of milk, yogurt, honey, sugar, and ghee)

Optional items
 Conch shell 
 One thousand Tulasi (Indian Basil) leaves.
 Tulasi manjari (flower of tulasi)
 Banana tree/leaves as a canopy
 White sesame seeds tila two tablespoons (White tila or white sesame seeds is favorite of Lord Satnarayan. Rose is his preferred flower)

See also
Puja
Annavaram Satyanarayana Temple
Gudem Satyanarayana Swamy
Satya Pir

References

Further reading
 Thousand Names of Vishnu and Satyanarayan Vrat by Swami Satyananda Saraswati, Devi Mandir.

External links
 Annavaram Devasthanam Official site for Annavaram Devastanam

Puja types in Hinduism
Vaishnavism
Hindu mantras